HMS Narwhal (N45) was one of the six ship class of Grampus-class mine-laying submarine of the Royal Navy. She was built by Vickers Armstrong, Barrow and launched 29 August 1935. She served in the Second World War in home waters.  She was lost in the North Sea on 23 July 1940, probably sunk by German aircraft.

Career
Narwhal had a brief but eventful career in wartime service.  In February 1940 she helped HMS Imogen and HMS Inglefield to sink the German U-boat U-63 south east of the Shetland Islands and in May she torpedoed and sank the German troop transport  and torpedoed and damaged the troop transport . Bahia Castillo reached port but was declared a total loss.

Most of Narwhal's sinkings were caused by her mines. The German auxiliary minesweepers M 1302 / Schwaben, M 1102/H.A.W. Möllerthe, Gnom 7, Kobold 1 and Kobold 3; the German minesweeper M 11; German auxiliary submarine chaser UJ D / Treff VIII; the armed trawler V 1109 / Antares and the Swedish merchant  were all sunk on mines laid by Narwhal.

Ships damaged by mines laid by Narwhal included the armed trawler V 403 / Deutschland, the German merchants Togo and Clara M. Russ.  The auxiliary minesweeper M 1101 / Fock und Hubert and the German merchant Palime also struck some of Narwhal's mines.  They were successfully beached but declared total losses.

Credit is often given to Narwhal for sinking the Norwegian fishing vessel Arild, but in reality Arild hit a German defensive mine.

Narwhal may also have sunk the German U-boat U-1 which disappeared on patrol on 6 April 1940, having been scheduled to sail unknowingly through a minefield Narwhal had laid earlier that day.  Alternatively, Narwhal's sister, Porpoise, reported firing upon an unknown submarine, which may account for U-1'''s loss.

SinkingNarwhal left Blyth on 22 July 1940. On the afternoon of 23 July an aircraft reported attacking a submarine in the area where Narwhal should have been. This was believed to be HMS Porpoise by the Germans but as Narwhal did not report again, it was assumed this attack sank her.

In 2017 a Polish expedition in search of  found a previously unknown wreck which they identified to be most likely HMS Narwhal'' based on sonar data.

References

Notes

External links
 HMS Narwhal from uboat.net

 

Grampus-class submarines
Ships built in Barrow-in-Furness
1935 ships
World War II submarines of the United Kingdom
Submarines sunk by aircraft
Lost submarines of the United Kingdom
World War II shipwrecks in the North Sea
Maritime incidents in July 1940
Ships sunk by German aircraft